Ocean Mysteries with Jeff Corwin is a television program which follows host Jeff Corwin's travels and works in conjunction with the Georgia Aquarium. It aired from 2011 to 2016 on Saturday mornings on ABC affiliates as part of the nature-oriented programming block called Litton's Weekend Adventure, along with complementary shows Jack Hanna's Wild Countdown, Born to Explore with Richard Wiese, and Sea Rescue.

The series focused on wildlife conservation, ocean research, and preserving the ocean and/or ocean adjacent habitats, with each episode generally featuring one or two ocean-dwelling or near ocean-dwelling species. Species featured have included various varieties of pinniped (seals, sea lions and walrus), dolphin, penguins, sea turtles, sting and eagle rays, iguanas, flightless birds of New Zealand, North American salmon, and whale sharks. Opening and closing segments generally take place within the environs of the Georgia Aquarium introducing same and/or similar species to be profiled on that episode from distant locations such as Southern Africa, California, Hawaii, Alaska, Canada (specifically British Columbia and Quebec), Australia, New Zealand, Florida, the Caribbean Sea, Puerto Rico, the Gulf of Mexico, and Grand Cayman Island.

In 2014, Ocean Mysteries won the Outstanding Travel Program category in the 41st Daytime Creative Arts Emmy Awards.  The program's director, Patrick Greene, won an Emmy Award for Outstanding Directing In A Lifestyle/Culinary Program. Reruns of this series will be airing on Antenna TV every Saturday morning beginning August 24, 2019.

References

External links
 
 

Nature educational television series
American children's education television series
American Broadcasting Company original programming
Litton Entertainment
2010s American children's television series
2010s American documentary television series
2011 American television series debuts
2016 American television series endings
Television series about mammals
Television series about reptiles and amphibians